Ambala district is one of the 22 districts of Haryana state in the country of India with Ambala town serving as the administrative headquarters of the district. District Ambala lies on the North-Eastern edge of Haryana and borders Punjab and Himachal Pradesh. Ambala district is a part of Ambala Division.

Divisions 

This district falls under the Ambala Lok Sabha constituency, which is a reserved for the Scheduled Caste candidates only. This district also has four Vidhan Sabha constituencies, all of which are part of Ambala Lok Sabha constituency. Those are Ambala City, Ambala Cantt, Mulana and Naraingarh.

Administration of this district falls under the Ambala division and law and order falls under the Ambala Police Range. The district administration has two sub-divisions, Ambala and Naraingarh. District is further subdivided into 4 community development blocks and 7 revenue tehsils. Community development blocks are Ambala, Ambala Cantt, Barara and Naraingarh. Tehsils are Ambala, Ambala Cantt, Barara, Mullana, Saha, Shahzadpur and Naraingarh.

Economy 
Being located in the Indo-Gangetic Plain, the land is generally fertile and conducive to agriculture. However, primary sector contributes much lesser to the economy of the district than it does to the economy of Haryana. Small scale industries form the bulk of the industrial landscape in the district. It is one of the largest producers of scientific and surgical instruments in the country and home to a large number of scientific instrument manufacturers due to which it is also referred as Science City .

Demographics 

According to the 2011 census, Ambala district had a population of 1,128,350 roughly equal to the nation of Cyprus or the US state of Rhode Island. It ranks 410th (out of a total of 640) in India in terms of population. Its population growth rate over the decade 2001-2011 was 11.23%. Ambala had a sex ratio of  885 females for every 1000 males, and a literacy rate of 81.75%. Scheduled Castes make up 26.25% of the population.

Hindi (In Devanagri Script) is the official languages and thus used for official communication. At the time of the 2011 Census of India, 84.57% of the population in the district spoke Hindi, 10.95% Punjabi and 2.72% Haryanvi as their first language.

Languages

Religion 
Population trends for major religious groups in Ambala district (1941–1961, 2001–2011)

Cities, towns, villages, and other communities 

 Ambala (city)
 Ambala Cantonment (city)
 Shahzadpur (town)
 Naraingarh (city)
 Kurali
 Harbon
 Barara (town)
 Saha
 Badhauli (village)
 Mullana (town)
 Kardhan (urban village)
 Sountli (village)

Notable people
 

Abdullah Sahib, a Gilgit Agency Governor

References

External links

Ambala district official website

 
Districts of Haryana